Nocturne of Love (German:Nocturno der Liebe) is a 1919 German silent historical film directed by Carl Boese and starring Conrad Veidt and Clementine Plessner. It portrays the life of the composer Frederic Chopin and is known by the alternative title Chopin.

Cast
In alphabetical order
Hermann Bachmann
Rita Clermont as Mariolka
Erna Denera as George Sand
Erwin Fichtner 
Clementine Plessner 
Ludwig Rex 
Hella Thornegg 
Conrad Veidt as Frederic Chopin
Gertrude Welcker as Sonja Radkowska

References

External links

1919 films
1910s historical films
German historical films
German biographical films
Films of the Weimar Republic
German silent feature films
Films directed by Carl Boese
Films about classical music and musicians
Films about composers
Films set in the 1820s
Films set in the 1830s
Films set in the 1840s
German black-and-white films
Cultural depictions of Frédéric Chopin
1910s biographical films
1910s German films